The 2018–19 Seattle Redhawks men's basketball team represents Seattle University during the 2018–19 NCAA Division I men's basketball season. The Redhawks, led by second-year head coach Jim Hayford, play their home games at the Redhawk Center, with two home games at the ShoWare Center, as members of the Western Athletic Conference. They finished the season 18–15, 6–10 in WAC play to finish in a tie for seventh place. They were defeated by Grand Canyon in the quarterfinals of the WAC tournament. They received an invitation to the CollegeInsider.com Tournament where they lost in the first round to Presbyterian.

Previous season
The Redhawks finished the 2017–18 season 20–14, 8–6 in WAC play to finish in fourth place. It was the Redhawks' first 20-win season since 2008 and first 20-win season in Division I play since the 1960s.

In the postseason, they defeated Texas–Rio Grande Valley to advance to the semifinals of the WAC tournament where they lost to New Mexico State. They received an invitation to the College Basketball Invitational where they lost in the first round to Central Arkansas.

Roster

Schedule and results

|-
!colspan=9 style=| Non-conference regular season

|-
!colspan=9 style=| WAC regular season

|-
!colspan=9 style=|WAC tournament

|-
!colspan=12 style=|CollegeInsider.com Postseason tournament
|-

References

Seattle Redhawks men's basketball seasons
Seattle Redhawks
Seattle Redhawks
Seattle Redhawks
Seattle Redhawks
Seattle
Seattle